During the 1993–94 English football season, Derby County F.C. competed in the Football League First Division.

Season summary
In October of the 1993–94 season, Arthur Cox retired from football following severe back problems, leaving the role after 9 years in charge.

He was replaced by his assistant Roy McFarland (who became the only man to manage the club permanently in two separate spells) who steered the club's to a second playoff campaign. After overcoming Millwall 5–1 on aggregate in the semifinal legs, and surviving a pitch invasion in the 3–1 win at the New Den, Derby came up against local rivals Leicester City at Wembley. Despite taking the lead through Tommy Johnson, Derby lost 2–1 after a double from Steve Walsh and missed out on promotion yet again.

Final league table

Results
Derby County's score comes first

Legend

Football League First Division

First Division play-offs

FA Cup

League Cup

Anglo-Italian Cup

Players

First-team squad
The following players all played for the first-team this season.

Reserve team
The following players did not appear for the first team this season.

References

Notes

Derby County F.C. seasons
Derby County